The Tiger Avon is a British kit car from Tiger Racing, a manufacturer formed in 1989 specialising in Lotus Seven type cars and racing cars.

The Tiger Avon is Tiger's entry level model, and can be fitted with different engines including the Ford Zetec, the Ford OHC and some motorcycle engines. The car consists of a steel spaceframe chassis with fully independent suspension and a fibreglass body. The Tiger Avon was formerly the Phoenix Automotive Avon Sprint. Tiger purchased this project, and modified the chassis and suspension to their requirements.

Specifications
Chassis: Space frame 1 inch box steel
Body: GRP
Engine: OHC Ford(pinto), Zetec, or motorcycle. (Other engines can be fitted.)
Transmission: Ford Sierra type 9
Steering: Rack and pinion 3.7 turns(option quick)
Brakes: Disc front, drum rear, option disc rear
Suspension: Adjustable front and rear shocks
Front track: 1300mm
Rear track: 1485mm
Wheelbase: 2280mm
Overall length: 3240mm
Weight: 595 kg with Zetec
Wheels: Standard Sierra offset
Tyres: 185-60-14 (option 15 inch)

References

Mark Berry. "Tiger racing takes off" The Cambs Times 16th Aug. 2007.
Tiff Needell. Channel 5's 5th Gear July 2006.

Further reading
Tiger Avon build diary Blog on Jamie Rogers' build experience.
Another Tiger Avon build diary Blog on Pete Codds build experience.

External links
 Tiger Racing
 Tiger Club Owners 

Kit cars